The 2002–03 season was FC Dinamo București's 54th season in Divizia A. In this season, Dinamo was affected again by the big number of players who left the team, which became a tradition for the bosses of the club to sell players after winning a title. Thus, Dinamo was again facing another reconstruction. They started the season badly, losing the two games in the UEFA Champions League qualifying phase, and leaving early the European competitions. Cornel Dinu was sacked after this two losses. In Divizia A Dinamo had hard times, changing a lot of managers and losing seven consecutive games. The team finished the season on the sixth position. A momentum of the season came in November, in the Romanian Cup, last 16, where Dinamo met the biggest rival Steaua. Dinamo won 3-0 the game played at the Cotroceni stadium. After Ioan Andone came to the team, Dinamo played a spectacular semifinal with Astra Ploieşti. They lost the first game, 2–1 in Ploieşti in the middle of the crisis, but then the team beat Astra in Bucharest 3-1 after extra time. They then went on to win the Romanian Cup, after beating FC Naţional in the final 1–0 on a goal scored by Iulian Tameş.

Results

UEFA Champions League 
Second qualifying round

Club Brugge KV won 4–1 on aggregate

Squad 
Goalkeepers: Cristian Munteanu (20/0), Daniel Tudor (6/0), Ştefan Preda (7/0).

Defenders: Angelo Alistar (1/0), Ovidiu Burcă (12/0), Alexandru Marius Dragomir (3/0), Cornel Frăsineanu (17/1), Bogdan Onuț (21/1), Gheorghe Popescu (8/0), Dorin Semeghin (1/0), Flavius Stoican (21/0), Iosif Tâlvan (10/0), Gabriel Tamaş (21/3).

Midfielders: Dan Alexa (24/0), Mugur Bolohan (6/0), Ciprian Danciu (4/0), Ştefan Grigorie (23/2), Giani Kiriţă (23/1), Vlad Munteanu (21/2), Florin Pârvu (19/0), Florentin Petre (25/2), Iulian Tameş (20/2).

Forwards: Cosmin Bărcăuan (23/12), Ionel Dănciulescu (26/16), Claudiu Drăgan (12/0), Ciprian Marica (10/1), Nicolae Mitea (9/0), Claudiu Niculescu (2/5).

Transfers 
New players: Gh.Popescu (Lecce), Alexa, Grigorie, Stoican, Bărcăuan (all from U.Craiova).

Left team: Prunea, Bolohan (FCM Bacău), O.Stângă (U.Craiova), Zicu (Farul)

References

External links 
 www.labtof.ro
 Romaniansoccer.ro
 Worldfootball.net

FC Dinamo București seasons
Dinamo Bucuresti